Nepean Hospital is a 520-bed teaching hospital.  providing tertiary referral services for the Nepean Blue Mountains Local Health District. Nepean Hospital is located at the base of the Blue Mountains in Kingswood, New South Wales, Australia.

The first Penrith hospital was opened in 1860, containing 6 beds and was located on the modern day Cox Street.

Nepean Emergency Department treats over 62,000 admitted patients annually. Opened in Feb 2023 The new
Emergency Department is a purpose built facility with an adjacent short stay unit, and provides emergency care for a diverse case mix including paediatric patients. It is supported by multi-speciality services including 24 beds in the Intensive Care Unit, 24-hour interventional cardiology, hematology, neurosurgery, thoracic surgery, urology, plastic surgery, paediatrics and obstetrics and gynaecology.

Also on the Nepean Hospital campus are a Neonatal ICU, Tresillian Family Care Centre, Menopause Service, Nepean Cancer Care Centre, Diabetes Service, in-patient psychiatric unit, Rehabilitation medicine and the Wentworth Centre for Drug and Alcohol Medicine. Nepean hospital hosts 19
operating theatres, with 6 operating theatres which opened in March 2012 & 15 more which opened in 2022.
The original operating theatres 
1-8 are currently being demolished to build pharmacy services.

Nepean Hospital's operating suite is a 24-hour service covering urology; gynaecology & obstetrics; colorectal; upper GIT; faciomax; plastics; thoracic; pain team; dental; orthopaedics; vascular; general, breast & endocrine, neurosurgery; ENT; general; some paediatric; some endoscopic and emergency surgical specialties.
Nepean hospital has been on “Trauma bypass” status for several years & no longer accepts multi-trauma patients. (Meaning if you get hit by a truck in Kingswood, you will wake up in Westmead)
Additionally, 24 hour access includes CT scanner and MRI services.

The Nepean Hospital new surgical wards, named East Wing, were opened on 12 March 2012. Built and designed under a Labor Government, it still did not meet the needs of Western Sydney.

The hospital hosts a clinical school of Sydney Medical School at the University of Sydney.

Upgrade and New Clinical Services Building(s) 

Under the Berejiklian Coalition Government, a multistage re-development of the hospital campus commenced in 2019, with the first of two new hospital towers planned to open in 2022. The stage 1 building will provide space for a refurbished emergency department, neonatal ICU, further operating suites and inpatient units, in addition to a rooftop helipad.

</ref>

See also 
 Healthcare in Australia
 Lists of hospitals
 List of hospitals in Australia

References

Hospitals in Sydney
Teaching hospitals in Australia
Hospitals established in 1956
Sydney Medical School
Werrington, New South Wales